Joseph Bobleter (April 19, 1846 – July 3, 1909) was an American newspaper editor and politician.

Biography
Joseph Bobleter was born in Dornbirn, Austria on April 19, 1846. He lived in New Ulm, Minnesota and was the editor/publisher of the New Ulm Review newspaper. He served in the 2nd Regiment Iowa Volunteer Cavalry during the American Civil War. He then served in the Minnesota National Guard was the adjutant general after the American Civil War. In 1883 and 1884, Bobleter served in the Minnesota House of Representatives and was a Republican. He also served as the mayor of New Ulm, Minnesota and as postmaster for New Ulm. From 1887 to 1895, Bobleter served as Minnesota State Treasurer.

He married Mary Schneider on September 5, 1879, and they had eight children.

Bobleter died in New Ulm on July 3, 1909.

Notes

External links

1846 births
1909 deaths
Austrian Empire emigrants to the United States
People from New Ulm, Minnesota
People of Minnesota in the American Civil War
Military personnel from Minnesota
Editors of Minnesota newspapers
State treasurers of Minnesota
Mayors of places in Minnesota
Republican Party members of the Minnesota House of Representatives
19th-century American politicians
Minnesota postmasters
19th-century American newspaper publishers (people)
19th-century American newspaper editors
People from Dornbirn